Robert J. Chatfield (known locally as 'Mayor Bob') (born 1943) is the mayor of Prospect, Connecticut. Chatfield, a Republican, has served as the mayor of Prospect since November 7, 1977 and is currently serving his 21st term. He was elected after he defeated incumbent Mayor, George Sabo. Chatfield is also the longest serving elected official in Connecticut. Chatfield lives with his wife Ginny. Their daughter Leslie has two children with her husband Duane; Zachary and Mackenzie.

Career
After going through the Prospect school system, Chatfield graduated from W.F. Kaynor Technical High School in the neighboring city of Waterbury, Connecticut. He then served in the United States Air Force from 1961 to 1965 and was stationed in Germany for three years.

Chatfield has many roles in Prospect in addition to being mayor. He has been a member of the Prospect Volunteer Fire Department for over 40 years, during which he served as Chief and Assistant Chief. Chatfield currently serves as the Fire Department's Day Commander, and is often the first to respond to calls.

References

1943 births
Living people
Connecticut Republicans
Mayors of places in Connecticut
People from Prospect, Connecticut
United States Air Force airmen